A wasla ( / ALA-LC: waṣlah; plural وَصَلَات / waṣalāt) is a set of pieces in Arabic music. It comprises eight or more movements such as muwashshah, taqsim, layali, mawwal, qasida, dawr, sama'i, bashraf, dulab, and popular songs.

The term is also used to refer to a segment of Sufi music.

References

Other sources
Racy, Ali Jihad (1983). "The Waslah: a Compound Form Principle in Egyptian Music", Arab Studies Quarterly, v. 5, no. 4, pp. 396-403.

See also
Fasıl

Arabic music
Musical forms
Classical and art music traditions